Educational attainment is a term commonly used by statisticians to refer to the highest degree of education an individual has completed as defined by the US Census Bureau Glossary.

See also
Academic achievement
Academic degree
Bachelor's degree
Doctorate degree
Educational attainment in the United States
Master's degree

References

Education economics
United States Census Bureau